Painite is a very rare borate mineral. It was first found in Myanmar by British mineralogist and gem dealer Arthur C.D. Pain who misidentified it as ruby, until it was discovered as a new gemstone in the 1950s. When it was confirmed as a new mineral species, the mineral was named after him. Due to its rarity, painite can cost in the range of between US$50,000 to $60,000 per carat. 

The chemical makeup of painite contains calcium, zirconium, boron, aluminium and oxygen (CaZrAl9O15(BO3)). The mineral also contains trace amounts of chromium and vanadium, which are responsible for Painite's typically orange-red to brownish-red color, similar to topaz. The mineral's rarity is due to the fact that zirconium and boron rarely interact with each other in nature. The crystals are naturally hexagonal in shape, and, until late 2004, only two had been cut into faceted gemstones.

Discovery and occurrence
Extensive exploration in the area surrounding Mogok, which comprises a large part of the extremely small region the mineral is known to exist in, has identified several new painite occurrences that have been vigorously explored resulting in several thousand new available painite specimens.

See also
List of minerals

References

External links
 

Gemstones
Borate minerals
Zirconium minerals
Aluminium minerals
Calcium minerals
Hexagonal minerals
Minerals in space group 176